"Dance the Way I Feel" is the debut single of British synthpop band Ou Est Le Swimming Pool. It was first released on 7 September 2009 as a limited edition 7-inch vinyl, and, on 9 November, it received a wider release across three formats.

Background
Three distinct versions of the song exist. The first appeared on the original release of the single. The second was a slightly remixed version of the first with different vocals, but was only available on a promo edition of the band's debut album. The third is the first with a new drum track added, and is the main single, album, and video version.

On 26 January 2011 the song was voted Number 3 on Triple J Hottest 100 for 2010.

Track listings

First release 7-inch
 "Dance the Way I Feel"
 "Enough Ready"

CD
 "Dance the Way I Feel"
 "Dance the Way I Feel" (Armand Van Helden Club Mix)
 "Dance the Way I Feel" (Blue Eyed Boy Remix)
 "Dance the Way I Feel" (The Drill Club Mix)

7-inch
 "Dance the Way I Feel"
 "Outside"

12-inch
 "Dance the Way I Feel" (Armand Van Helden Club Mix)
 "Dance the Way I Feel" (Armand Van Helden Dub)

Charts

Weekly charts

Year-end charts

Certifications

References

2009 debut singles
2009 songs
Ou Est le Swimming Pool songs
Stiff Records singles